Turis Fratyr is the first studio album released by German folk metal band Equilibrium. It was released on 14 February 2005. A 2008 re-release included Demo 2003 as a bonus disc.

Track listing

References

2005 debut albums
Equilibrium (band) albums